Weed is an unincorporated community in Poinsett County, Arkansas, United States. Weed is located on the north bank of the St. Francis River and the BNSF Railway near the northwest border of Marked Tree.

References

Unincorporated communities in Poinsett County, Arkansas
Unincorporated communities in Arkansas